The 2016 Women's Twenty20 Cup, known for sponsorship reasons as the 2016 NatWest Women's Twenty20 Cup was the 8th cricket Women's Twenty20 Cup tournament. It took place in June and July, with 36 teams taking part: 34 county teams plus Scotland and Wales. Kent Women won the Twenty20 Cup, their third title, and completed the double later in 2016 with their victory in the County Championship.

The tournament ran alongside the 50-over 2016 Women's County Championship, and was followed by the inaugural Twenty20 Women's Cricket Super League, competed for by regional teams.

Competition format

Teams played matches within a series of divisions with the winners of the top division being crowned the Champions. Matches were played using a Twenty20 format.

The championship worked on a points system with positions within the divisions being based on the total points. Points were awarded as follows:

Win: 4 points. 
Tie: 1 point. 
Loss: 0 points.
Abandoned/Cancelled: 1 point.

Teams 
The 2016 Women's Twenty20 Cup was divided into four divisions: Division One and Division Two with eight teams each, Division Three with nine teams and Division Four with 11 teams, divided into three regional groups; teams played between six and eight games, depending on the division.

Division One 

 Source: ECB Women's Twenty20 Cup

Division Two 

 Source: ECB Women's Twenty20 Cup

Division Three 

 Source: ECB Women's Twenty20 Cup

Division Four

Group A

 Source: ECB Women's Twenty20 Cup

Group B

 Source: ECB Women's Twenty20 Cup

Group C

 Source: ECB Women's Twenty20 Cup

Statistics

Most runs

Source: CricketArchive

Most wickets

Source: CricketArchive

References

Women's Twenty20 Cup
 
2016 in Scottish cricket
cricket
cricket